Coiled tubing umbilicals are a type of piping used in oil and gas wells.

Background
The piping can be used during interventions. They encapsulate multiple coiled tubing and electrical strings into a single string which can be deployed by one conventional unit.  These technologies allow for the deployment of complex pumps on coiled tubing.  Multiple strings in a casing may maintain a manageable shape for the tubing and eliminating the danger of ovalization.

Petroleum production
Industrial equipment
Oil wells
Tubing (material)